Misunderstood is a 1984 American drama film directed by Jerry Schatzberg, based on the 1869 novel Misunderstood by Florence Montgomery. This film stars Henry Thomas as a young boy who struggles with family, friends, and relationships after his mother's death.

The novel Misunderstood had previously been adapted as the 1966 Italian film Incompreso, which starred Anthony Quayle.

Plot
Ned Rawley is an American shipowner established in Tunisia where his business thrives and monopolizes him. He lives in a beautiful villa with his two sons, Miles and Andrew, who are cared for by a newly arrived housekeeper because their mother has just died in a hospital abroad. The father decides to hide this tragedy from the youngest, inventing an extended trip for his mother.

For the older one, he continues to treat him as a "man", revealing to him the disappearance of his mother but remaining cold with him, being afraid to express his feelings. He does not realize that his son lacks affection and suffers from the absences and the harshness of education imposed on him by his father who transfers all his attentions to the youngest.

Finally, it is only during an accident caused by Andrew that the father and son will get closer.

Cast

Reception

Box office

Made on a budget of $10 million, the movie was also relying on A-List success of Gene Hackman and Henry Thomas, the latter of which was a successful child star who appeared in several blockbusters during that era. But the film flopped at the box office, opening at #11 with $916,967 in 741 screens, and went on to gross just $1,525,532 in its entire domestic run.

Production
Shooting took place over four months in 1982. The director shot two endings, and wanted to use the more tragic one. The producer, Tarak Ben Ammar, then assembled his own more upbeat version of the film, adding extra flashbacks. This was then changed by MGM/UA.

References

Citations

Sources

External links

1984 films
1984 independent films
1984 drama films
American drama films
American independent films
American remakes of Italian films
Films about brothers
Films about children
Films about dysfunctional families
Films based on British novels
Films directed by Jerry Schatzberg
Metro-Goldwyn-Mayer films
Films with screenplays by Barra Grant
United Artists films
1980s English-language films
1980s American films